The Ajay-class patrol vessels were built by Garden Reach Shipbuilders & Engineers in the 1960s. The lead vessel,  was the first warship built in Independent India. They were sometimes viewed as a variant of the s. Two were transferred to the Bangladesh Navy and one to Mauritius; later versions could have different armament

Ships

References 

Indian Navy
Bangladesh Navy
Patrol boat classes